The Chinese University of Hong Kong Art Museum is an art museum located on the main campus of the Chinese University of Hong Kong.

See also
 Department of Fine Arts, Chinese University of Hong Kong
 List of museums in Hong Kong

External links

Chinese University of Hong Kong
Art museums and galleries in Hong Kong
1971 establishments in Hong Kong